Asian Highway 13 (AH13) is a road in the Asian Highway Network running  from Hanoi, Vietnam to Nakhon Sawan, Thailand. The route is as follows:

Vietnam
: Hanoi ( and ) - Dien Bien 
: Dien Bien - Thai Trang border crossing

Laos
 Route 2E: Thai Chang border crossing - Muang May - Muang Khoua - Oudomxay
 Route 2W: Oudomxay - Muang Ngeun - Ngeun border checkpoint

Thailand
: Huai Kon border checkpoint - Huai Kon - Den Chai
: Phrae bypass
: Den Chai - Uttaradit - Phitsanulok
: Phitsanulok - Nakhon Sawan

Asian Highway Network
Roads in Thailand

Roads in Laos